Lucius Caecilius Iucundus (born) was a banker who lived in the Roman town of Pompeii around 14–62 CE. His house still stands and can be seen in the ruins of the city of Pompeii which remain after being partially destroyed by the eruption of Vesuvius in 79 CE. The house is known both for its frescoes and for the trove of wax tablets discovered there in 1875, which gave scholars access to the records of Iucundus' banking operations. 

Iucundus is the basis of the character 'Caecilius' in the Cambridge Latin Course, a British series of Latin textbooks based around the life of Caecilius and his family.

Life 

Little is known for sure about Iucundus' life. He was born around the end of Augustus's reign (that is, before ) to a freedman named Felix, who was also a banker. He is likely to have entered the banking business by 27 CE, By 58 CE he was well-established as a successful banker who dealt with a wide variety of Pompeiians. He is believed to have had offices either in the macellum or in his house, and to have worked alongside around six associates, including a freedman of the Helvii family named Apollonaris.Freedmen and slaves performed many small business tasks for Iucundus, such as signing receipts as witnesses and collecting payments from clients. The freedmen Phoebus, Communis and Chryseros are named in his records as acting for him, as are the slaves Philadelphus, Menippus and Dionysus.

Many names of elite Pompeian citizens occur frequently in his transaction records, suggesting that Iucundus also had dealings with the upper class of his town. In fact, he even travelled to nearby Nuceria to help the wealthy Praetorian Guard senior centurion Publius Alfenus Varus resell some slaves that he had purchased in an auction.

He had at least two sons, Sextus Caecilius Iucundus Metellus and Quintus Caecilius Iucundus. Iucundus departed from the traditional naming system, giving each of his sons a name that implied a relationship with the illustrious family of the Caecilii Metelli. Little is known of either, though the incomplete state of the records of Iucundus' business — which were buried in his house, alongside unfinished and unused tablets, in 79 CE, but contain no records later than 62 — has been taken as evidence that they did not follow their father into the banking trade.

The tablets that Iucundus left behind suggest that he died in the earthquake on 5 February 62, since his records stop a few days before that date. His name does not appear in any known inscriptions from the 70s, and he was almost certainly dead by 79 CE, by which point he would have been at least seventy.

Banking in Pompeii 
The Pompeian  would pay the vendor for the purchased item and then grant the buyer a time frame in which to repay him.

Some , called , collected debt money in addition to making arrangements in the auctions, while other  were assisted by  who collected the debts for them.

Wax tablets 
Iucundus kept many private records of his business transactions on wax tablets, many of which were found in his house in 1875. The state of these documents has been described as "ruinous": many were charred beyond legibility by the eruption of Vesuvius.

All of the documents are receipts. Of the 153 tablets discovered, two date from 15 and 27 CE, and so are likely the records of Iucundus' father Felix; sixteen are receipts for contracts between Iucundus and the city of Pompeii, and the remaining 137 are receipts from auctions on behalf of third parties. Seventeen tablets record loans that Iucundus advanced to buyers of auction items. The tablets testify to the success of Iuncundus' business: all but three record transactions in excess of 1,000  (HS), while their median value is 4,500 HS and three record deals worth over 30,000 HS. A Roman legionary's annual pay during the same period was 225 , or 900 HS. One receipt of 14 March 53 CE records the payment by Iucundus for a tax farming contract.

In addition to the transaction information, Iucundus' tablets record the names of vendors and witnesses to the arrangements. The lists of witnesses also give some insight into the social structure of Pompeii, since Iucundus had his witnesses sign in order of social status. The tablets include a reference to the freedman Marcus Venerius Secundio, whose tomb in the Porta Sarno necropolis was excavated in 2021. In total, the names of around 115 people (excluding those acting as witnesses) are known from the tablets, of which fourteen — all sellers in auctions — belong to women.

The tablets themselves are mostly triptychs, which means that they have three wooden leaves tied together to make six pages. Wax was put on the inner four pages, and the receipt was written on these surfaces. The tablet was then closed and wrapped with a string, over which the witnesses placed their wax seals. This prevented the document itself from being altered, and there was a brief description of the receipt written on the outside for identification purposes.

Inscription from a tablet 
The following is the translation of a 56 CE receipt for the proceeds of an auction sale.

In this inscription, Iucundus included the date and the list of witnesses, which were listed in descending order of social status. By examining several of his tablets, it is possible to determine the relative social standings of clients with whom Iucundus arranged numerous transactions.

House 

It is known for the discovery of Iucundus' business records and wax tablets, as well as for its wall-paintings. The  was once decorated with paintings; the floor is decorated with a black and white mosaic and at the entrance a reclining dog is depicted. Most of these images are now displayed in the National Archaeological Museum, Naples.

Several graffiti messages have been found on the walls of the house, including one that reads "May those who love prosper; let them perish who cannot love; let them perish twice over who forbid love." Another, which probably postdates Iucundus' death, proclaims his son Quintus' support for Ceius Secundus, a candidate for the office of duumvir. 

The , or study, contains numerous wall paintings. An amphora given by one of his sons, Sextus, to the other, Quintus, was also found in the house.

Gallery

Depictions in fiction 

Book One of the Cambridge Latin Course is a fictionalised account of the life of Iucundus, who is referred to as 'Caecilius' in the series.

In the book, he has a wife, Metella, and a son, Quintus, on whom books two and three in the series are based. He also has two slaves; a gardener named Clemens, and a cook named Grumio. It is also revealed that Caecilius once had another slave, Felix. However, after he saved Quintus from a kidnapping attempt, Caecilius manumitted him. In the Cambridge Latin Course, Caecilius dies in the 79 CE eruption of Vesuvius.

Iucundus, along with his banking profession, also has a minor role in Robert Harris's 2003 novel Pompeii.

In a 2008 episode of British television science-fiction series Doctor Who entitled "The Fires of Pompeii", Peter Capaldi portrays Lobus Caecilius, a marble merchant based on Iucundus. In this story, he and his family are saved from the eruption by the Doctor, who transports them to safety.

References

Bibliography

External links 

 Images of L. Caecilius Iucundus' house and its wall paintings
 Caecilius at Nova Roma
 German woodcut depicting the bas-relief from the house of Lucius Caecilius Iucundus
 Reconstruction of the House of Lucius Caecilius Iucundus in Pompeii by 3D technology

1st-century births
62 deaths
Roman archaeology
Roman-era inhabitants of Italy
Ancient Roman bankers
1st-century Romans
Iucundus, Lucius
People from Pompeii (ancient city)
Deaths in earthquakes